Tarbell may refer to:

 USS Tarbell (DD-142), a US Navy destroyer
 Tarbell Cassette Interface, for storing computer data on audio cassette
 Tarbell Course in Magic, an encyclopedia of magic written by Harlan Tarbell

People with the surname Tarbell:
 Edmund C. Tarbell (1862–1938), American impressionist painter
 Frank Bigelow Tarbell (1853–1920), American historian and archeologist
 Harlan Tarbell (1890–1960), American stage magician and illustrator
 Ida Tarbell (1857–1944), American author and journalist
 Jim Tarbell (fl. 1940s–2010s), Cincinnati councilman
 Jonathan Tarbell (1820–1888), Justice of the Supreme Court of Mississippi
 Joseph Tarbell (1780–1815), American naval officer

See also
 Tarbell Brook, a New Hampshire stream
 Tarball (disambiguation)